Michael Thomas "Mickey" Sutton (born July 17, 1943) is a former American football safety in the American Football League (AFL). After playing college football for Auburn, Sutton was drafted by the Chicago Bears in the 7th round (90th overall) of the 1965 National Football League Draft. Sutton played one season for the AFL's Houston Oilers (1966).

References

1943 births
Living people
Sportspeople from Mobile, Alabama
Players of American football from Alabama
American football safeties
Auburn Tigers football players
Houston Oilers players
American Football League players